llVV ("All Tvvins"; the first two characters are lower-case L's) is the debut album by Irish electronic rock band All Tvvins. It was released through Warner Music UK on August 12, 2016.

Track listing

Uses in media
 Their single "Darkest Ocean" was featured in the soundtrack of FIFA 16, the video game by EA Sports. It is also used on Saturday Sport, and Sunday Sport on RTÉ Radio.
 Their song, "Thank You" featured as soundtrack in Konami game, Pro Evolution Soccer 2017.
 Their song “Resurrect Me” is used on the 2020 Sky Sports television advert for the GAA championship.

Charts

References 

2016 debut albums
All Tvvins albums
Warner Records albums